The Liberal Party of Ghana is a political party in Ghana. The party replaced the Independent People's Party (IPP) which was originally founded by Kofi Akpaloo in 2011. Akpaloo, who was nominated to be the presidential candidate for the IPP was disqualified from contesting the 2016 Ghanaian general election due to problems with his nomination forms. The new party pledges to put people's lives first through technology.

2020 general election
The party endorsed Kofi Akpaloo as their presidential candidate. The running mate selected was Margaret Obrine Sarfo. Jerry Owusu, the Director of Operations of the party announced in May 2020 that the party intends to field candidates in all 275 constituencies throughout the country.

Electoral performance

Parliamentary elections

Presidential elections

See also
 List of political parties in Ghana

References

2017 establishments in Ghana
Political parties established in 2017
Political parties in Ghana